Gorki is a rural locality (a village) in Andreyevskoye Rural Settlement, Alexandrovsky District, Vladimir Oblast, Russia. The population was 10 as of 2010.

Geography 
The village is located on the north bank of the Maly Kirchazh River.

References 

Rural localities in Alexandrovsky District, Vladimir Oblast